Chithiram Pesuthadi 2 is a 2019 Indian Tamil-language hyperlink drama film written and directed by Rajan Madhav. It features an ensemble cast including Vidharth, Ajmal Ameer, Ashok Kumar, Radhika Apte, Nivedhitha, Gayathrie, Nivas Adithan, and newcomers Nandan Loganathan and Priya Banerjee. The film has music composed by Sajan Madhav, cinematography by Padmesh and editing by K. Venkatramanan. The film is a connection of four different stories that happen in 48 hours. The satellite rights of the film were sold to Colors Tamil.

The film which began production in 2013 under the title Ula was shot in and around Chennai, and the film was released in 15 February 2019. Although the title may suggest it as a sequel to the 2006 blockbuster Chithiram Pesuthadi, the storyline is entirely different, hence proving no apparent relationship between the two films, even though both films were produced by the same producer.

The film also stars West Indian cricketer Dwayne Bravo in cameo appearance.

Plot 
Thiru (Vidharth) is a hired killer who attacks a dreaded gangster (Shammi Thilakan) with a sickle but has to escape as he is witnessed by Kathir (Nandan) and is forced to go underground with Salim (Ashok Kumar). Kathir admits the gangster in a hospital and also informs the police but fails to keep an appointment with his girlfriend Priya (Gayathrie), who has come out of her house to elope with him. Salim is ordered by his boss (Subbu Panchu) to finish off the gangster, who is now hospitalized, and also kill Thiru after that. Meanwhile, the gangster's wife Durga (Radhika Apte) rushes to the hospital but seems to be intent on seeing her husband die rather than saving him.  The fourth plot involves Vicky (Ajmal Ameer), who is in the danger of losing his property and turns to blackmail to get the three crores to save it. There is yet another story of two thieves, Mani (Nivas Adithan) and Senthil Palani (Blade Shankar), who rob Priya's bag, which contains her family jewel with the former in love with a call girl named Dhanalakshmi (Nivedhitha), who in turn is in love with Thiru. There is also a policeman (Aadukalam Naren) and industrialist, another cop who is badly in need of money and hatches a plan to rob a businessman.

Cast

Production 
In July 2012, actor Prasanna revealed that Rajan Madhav had finished his next script and that he would be a part of the cast. The film was titled as Ula in August 2012 and was said to be a multi-starrer. Thaman was signed to compose the film's score and soundtrack, while Padmesh and Praveen K. L.-N. B. Srikanth were picked as the cinematographer and the editors. In a turn of events, the film changed a number of technicians with a new editor and music composer being recruited.

The shoot of the film began in March 2013. Along with Prasanna, Narain was supposed to play the lead roles, but the pair were subsequently replaced with Ajmal and Ashok Kumar, while Gayathrie was selected to play the female lead. Ajmal stated that he played a rock star in the film and that he was paired with Mumbai-based Priya Banerjee. In August 2013, a song, penned by Madhan Karky, was to be shot. Vidharth said that he played the role of a rowdy gang leader. Gayathrie in October 2013 stated that every character in the film comes in shades of grey and that seventy per cent of the film had been completed. West Indies cricketer Dwayne Bravo had agreed to dance for a song in the film, which was shot in October 2013.

After four years of delay, in October 2018, the film's title was changed from Ula to Chithiram Pesuthadi 2.

Reception 
Srivatsan S of The Hindu derided the film for being outdated.

Soundtrack 
Dal Meni Dal Meni – Gaana Bala, Naveen Madhav, Dwayne Bravo

References

External links 
 

2019 films
2010s Tamil-language films
2019 thriller drama films
Indian thriller drama films
Indian nonlinear narrative films
2019 drama films